The Anadarko Basin is a geologic depositional and structural basin centered in the western part of the state of Oklahoma and the Texas Panhandle, and extending into southwestern Kansas and southeastern Colorado. By the end of the 20th Century, the Anadarko Basin was producing the largest amount of natural gas in the United States. Notable oil and gas fields within the basin include the Hugoton-Panhandle Gas Field, West Edmond Field, Union City Field and the Elk City Field. The basin is also the only commercial source of iodine in the United States and a major producer of helium.

Name
The name likely comes from either the city of Anadarko, Oklahoma or the Nadaco tribe.

Geology
The basin is bound on the south by the Wichita-Amarillo uplift, on the east by the Nemaha uplift, on the north by the Central Kansas uplift, and on the west by the Las Animas arch.

Sedimentary rocks from Cambrian through Permian age fill the basin.

Natural resources

Natural gas
In 2010, the U.S. Geological Survey estimated that the Anadarko Basin held 27.5 trillion cubic feet of natural gas and 410 million barrels of natural gas liquids (NGL). An IHS Markit's report estimated more than 200 trillion cubic feet of natural gas in the basin. It is also the 5th largest Natural Gas formation area in the United States.

The Lone Star Bertha Rogers well in Beckham County, Oklahoma held the record as the world's deepest producing well in 1974-1979. It has subsequently been surpassed by several other deep wells, see deepest artificial point.

Crude Oil
In 2010, the U.S. Geological Survey estimated that the Anadarko Basin held 495 million barrels of oil. In 2019, IHS Markit estimated that unconventional reservoirs in unrisked technically recoverable resources of the basin account for 16 billion barrels.

Brine
The brine in the Pennsylvanian Morrow Formation in the Anadarko Basin contains about 300 parts per million iodine, and is the only current commercial source of that element in the United States. Iodine production in 2005 was 1,570 tonnes. North American Brine Resources operates a plant near Dover, Oklahoma.

Helium
Some natural gas in the basin has unusually high helium content (greater than 0.3%).  Helium is recovered from produced natural gas as a byproduct. According to the Bureau of Land Management, Helium reserves in the Anadarko basin account for almost one billion cubic meters.

See also
Wichita Mountains
Hugoton Natural Gas Area

References

External links 
 New Mexico and Arizona Land Company
 Encyclopedia of Oklahoma History and Culture - Anadarko Basin

Geologic provinces of the United States
Geography of Oklahoma
Geology of Oklahoma
Geology of Texas
Geology of Kansas
Geology of Colorado
Natural gas fields in the United States
Structural basins of the United States